Marie Guenet de Saint-Ignace (1610-1646) was a French-Canadian abbess and hospital manager. She was the founder and manager of the convent hospital  Hôtel-Dieu de Québec in Quebec in 1639. It was the eldest women convent in Quebec, founded the same year as the Ursuline school convent by Marie de l'Incarnation - the two groups of nuns came to Canada in the same ship.

References 

 Sainte-Jeanne-de-Chantal Martin, o.s.a., "GUENET, MARIE, dite de Saint-Ignace," in Dictionary of Canadian Biography, vol. 1, University of Toronto/Université Laval, 2003–, accessed June 13, 2016, http://www.biographi.ca/en/bio/guenet_marie_1E.html.

1610 births
1646 deaths
17th-century Canadian people
Canadian abbots